The New-York Historical Society gives three book prizes annually. From 2005 to 2012 there was one award for American history. A second award was added in 2013 for children's history. A third award was added in 2016 for military history.

Barbara and David Zalaznick Book Prize in American History
The Barbara and David Zalaznick Book Prize in American History, prior to 2016 known as The New-York Historical Society American History Book Prize or, simply, the American History Book Prize, is an American literary award given annually by the New-York Historical Society for an adult non-fiction book on American history or biography, copyrighted in the year of the award, "that is distinguished by its scholarship, its literary style and its appeal to a general as well as an academic audience." The winner receives an engraved medal, $50,000 cash and the unofficial title of American Historian Laureate. The inaugural award was presented in 2006 for books published in 2005.

Winners
Date is year when books were published; the following year is when the award was given. Thus the inaugural award was given in 2006 for Team of Rivals published in 2005.
2005 Doris Kearns Goodwin, Team of Rivals: The Political Genius of Abraham Lincoln
2006 David Nasaw, Andrew Carnegie (biography of Andrew Carnegie)
2007 Daniel Walker Howe, What Hath God Wrought: The Transformation of America, 1815–1848
2008 Drew Gilpin Faust, This Republic of Suffering: Death and the American Civil War
2009 Gordon S. Wood, Empire of Liberty: A History of the Early Republic, 1789–1815
2010 Ron Chernow, Washington: A Life (biography of George Washington)
2011 John Lewis Gaddis, George F. Kennan: An American Life (biography of George F. Kennan)
2012 Robert Caro, The Passage of Power: The Years of Lyndon Johnson

2013 Andrew O'Shaughnessy, The Men Who Lost America: British Leadership, the American Revolution and the Fate of the Empire
2014 Jill Lepore, The Secret History of Wonder Woman
2015 Eric Foner, Gateway to Freedom: The Hidden History of the Underground Railroad
2016 Jane Kamensky, A Revolution in Color: The World of John Singleton Copley
2017 John A. Farrell, Richard Nixon: The Life
2018 Benn Steil, The Marshall Plan: Dawn of the Cold War 
2019 Rick Atkinson, The British Are Coming: The War for America, Lexington to Princeton, 1775-1777
2020 Tracy Campbell, The Year of Peril: America in 1942
2021 Alan Taylor, American Republics: A Continental History of the United States, 1783-1850

New-York Historical Society Children's History Book Prize
The New-York Historical Society Children's History Book Prize was first award in 2013 for the best children's historical literature.

Winners

 2013 Kristin Levine, The Lions of Little Rock  
 2014 Helen Frost, Salt: A Story of Friendship in a Time of War 
 2015 Pam Muñoz Ryan, Echo 
 2016 Ann E. Burg, Unbound: A Novel in Verse 
 2016 Firoozeh Dumas, It Ain’t So Awful Falafel 
 2017 Laura Atkins and Stan Yogi (Authors), Yutaka Houlette (Illustrator), Fred Korematsu Speaks Up 
 2018 Ellen Klages, Out of Left Field 
 2019 Erica Armstrong Dunbar and Kathleen Van Cleve, Never Caught: The Story of Ona Judge

Gilder Lehrman Prize for Military History
The Gilder Lehrman Prize for Military History at the New-York Historical Society was first awarded in 2016 for the best book on military history in the English-speaking world. Prior to 2016, the prize was known as the Guggenheim-Lehrman Prize in Military History, established in 2013 by the Harry Frank Guggenheim Foundation, the inaugural prize was awarded in February 2014. The purpose of the prize is to increase public attention to military history for educational purposes.

Winners

 2013 Allen C. Guelzo, Gettysburg: The Last Invasion ' 
 2014 Alexander Watson, Ring of Steel: Germany and Austria-Hungary at War, 1914-1918 
 2015 David L. Preston, Braddock's Defeat: The Battle of the Monongahela and the Road to Revolution
 2016  Peter Cozzens, The Earth is Weeping: The Epic Story of the Indian Wars for the American West
2017 Cathal Nolan, The Allure of Battle: A History of How Wars Have Been Won and Lost
2018 Andrew Lambert, Seapower States: Maritime Culture, Continental Empires and the Conflict That Made the Modern World
2019 John C. McManus, Fire and Fortitude: The US Army in the Pacific War, 1941–1943 
2020 Alexander Mikaberidze, The Napoleonic Wars: A Global History
2021 Kevin J. Weddle, The Compleat Victory: Saratoga and the American Revolution

See also

 List of history awards

References

External links
Gilder Lehrman Prize for Military History, official website.

Awards established in 2006
Awards established in 2014
2006 establishments in New York (state)
Biography awards
American history awards
American non-fiction literary awards
2014 establishments in New York (state)